The canton of Égletons is an administrative division of the Corrèze department, south-central France. Its borders were modified at the French canton reorganisation which came into effect in March 2015. Its seat is in Égletons.

It consists of the following communes:
 
Champagnac-la-Noaille
Chapelle-Spinasse
Chaumeil
Égletons
Lafage-sur-Sombre
Lapleau
Laval-sur-Luzège
Marcillac-la-Croisille
Montaignac-sur-Doustre
Moustier-Ventadour
Rosiers-d'Égletons
Saint-Hilaire-Foissac
Saint-Merd-de-Lapleau
Saint-Yrieix-le-Déjalat
Sarran
Soursac
Vitrac-sur-Montane

References

Cantons of Corrèze